Lisa Duggan is Professor of Social and Cultural Analysis at New York University. Duggan was president of the American Studies Association from 2014 to 2015, presiding over the annual conference on the theme of "The Fun and the Fury: New Dialectics of Pleasure and Pain in the Post-American Century." 

Duggan earned her Ph.D. from the University of Pennsylvania.

Duggan is also one of the editors of queer commentary website, Bully Bloggers, developed with José Esteban Muñoz, Jack Halberstam, and Tavia Nyong’o. Duggan has described herself as a "commie pinko queer feminist". She was written on topics including feminist responses to pornography and homonormativity.

Bibliography
 Sex Wars: Sexual Dissent and Political Culture with Nan D. Hunter (Routledge, 1995)
Sapphic Slashers: Sex, Violence and American Modernity (Duke University Press, 2000)
 ed. Our Monica, Ourselves: The Clinton Affair and National Interest with Lauren Berlant (New York University Press, 2001)
 The Twilight of Equality?: Neoliberalism, Cultural Politics, and the Attack on Democracy (Beacon Press, 2003)
 Mean Girl: Ayn Rand and the Culture of Greed (University of California Press, 2019)

References

External links 

 Archive of posts at Bully Bloggers

American communists
Living people
LGBT studies academics
New York University faculty
University of Pennsylvania alumni
Year of birth missing (living people)
Queer feminists
Queer women
American socialist feminists
LGBT academics
American women non-fiction writers